Charles Cyrus Kearns (February 11, 1869 – December 17, 1931) was an American lawyer and politician who served as a Republican member of the U.S. House of Representatives from Ohio from 1915 to 1931.

Biography 
Charles C. Kearns was born in Tonica, Illinois.  He moved with his parents to Georgetown, Ohio, in 1874.  He attended the public schools in Georgetown, Ohio, Ohio Northern University at Ada, and National Normal University in Lebanon, Ohio.  He taught school in Brown County, Ohio.  He graduated from the Cincinnati Law School in 1894, and was admitted to the bar the same year and commenced practice in Batavia, Ohio.  He was the managing editor of the Las Vegas Daily Record in Las Vegas, New Mexico, in 1900 and 1901 and of the Daily Record in Hot Springs, Arkansas, in 1901 and 1902.  He returned to Ohio in 1903 and practiced law in Batavia.  He was the prosecuting attorney of Clermont County, Ohio, from 1906 to 1909.

Congress 
Kearns was elected as a Republican to the Sixty-fourth and to the seven succeeding Congresses.  He was an unsuccessful candidate for reelection in 1930 to the Seventy-second Congress.

Later career and death 
He was engaged in the practice of law at Cincinnati, Ohio, in 1930, and died in Amelia, Ohio.  Interment in Mount Moriah Cemetery in Tobasco, Ohio.

Sources

The Political Graveyard

1869 births
1931 deaths
People from Tonica, Illinois
Ohio Northern University alumni
University of Cincinnati College of Law alumni
People from Georgetown, Ohio
People from Batavia, Ohio
National Normal University alumni
County district attorneys in Ohio
Republican Party members of the United States House of Representatives from Ohio